Hope is a 2019 Norwegian semi-autobiographical drama film directed by Maria Sødahl, based on the experience she faced with her husband, director Hans Petter Moland, when, nine years earlier, she had received a terminal diagnosis of brain cancer and was given by doctors only three months to live. The film was selected as the Norwegian entry for the Best International Feature Film at the 93rd Academy Awards, making the shortlist of fifteen films. The film premiered at the 44th Toronto International Film Festival on 7 September 2019 and was first thetrically released in Norway on 22 November 2019.

Synopsis
A married couple must confront their long-neglected relationship when the wife is diagnosed with brain cancer.

Cast
 Andrea Bræin Hovig as Anja
 Stellan Skarsgård as Tomas

Reception

Box office
Hope grossed $0 in the United States and Canada, and a worldwide total of $2.7 million.

Critical response

See also
 List of submissions to the 93rd Academy Awards for Best International Feature Film
 List of Norwegian submissions for the Academy Award for Best International Feature Film

References

External links
 
 

2019 films
2019 drama films
autobiographical films
Norwegian drama films
2010s Norwegian-language films
Zentropa films